Kaiyuan Temple is a Buddhist temple located in West Street, Quanzhou, China, and is considered as the largest Buddhist temple in Fujian province with an area of . Kaiyuan Temple was one of the few surviving Hindu temples in Mainland China. The central figures of veneration in the temple are the Five Tathāgathas from Chinese Esoteric Buddhism who are enshrined in the temple's Mahavira Hall. In 2021, the temple was inscribed on the UNESCO World Heritage List along with other sites near Quanzhou because of its importance during the medieval global maritime trade based in Quanzhou and its testimony to the global exchange of ideas and cultures.

History
It was originally built in 685 or 686 during the Tang dynasty (618–907). The temple situated in the Mulberry garden of landlord Huang Shougong who was said to dream of a monk begging land from him for building a temple. He donated his garden and changed it into a temple with the name of "Lotus Temple". In 738 in the Tang dynasty, it was renamed "Kaiyuan Temple", which is still in use now.

Behind its main hall "Mahavira Hall", there are some columns with fragments as well is vigraha (idol) of Lord Vishnu from a Vishnu temple built in 1283 by the Tamil Ainnurruvar Valanjiyar Merchant community in Quanzhou. The carvings are dispersed across five primary sites in Quanzhou and the neighboring areas. They were made in the South Indian style, and share close similarities with 13th-century temples constructed in the Chola Nadu region in Tamil Nadu. Nearly all of the carvings were carved with greenish-gray granite, which was widely available in the nearby hills and used in the region's local architecture. In 1983, the Kaiyuan Temple was designated as a national temple.

The Silk trade by sea brought the South Indians to China and the Chinese to Southern Indian ports and it is very likely the Indians took the knowledge of Silk cultivation and fabrics from China back to India. China had a significant influence on South India; examples of Chinese fishing nets in Kochi and fine china pottery still referred to as "Chini chatti" or Chinese pot in Tamil.

Architecture
Along the central axis are the Four Heavenly Kings Hall, Mahavira Hall, Sweet Dew Altar of Precepts and Buddhist Texts Library. There are over 10 halls and rooms on both sides, including Tanyue Ancestral Temple, Virtue Hall and Zunsheng Hall.

Hall of Four Heavenly Kings
The Hall of Four Heavenly Kings was built in the Tang dynasty (618–907). It serves as the Shanmen of the temple. In front of the hall, a wooden plaque with a couplet is hung on the hall. It says "Here is the place the ancients called "Buddha State", all are saints in the streets". It was composed by Song dynasty scholar Zhu Xi and inscribed by eminent monk Hong Yi.

Mahavira Hall
The Mahavira Hall was originally built in 686 in the Tang dynasty (618–907) and the extant buildings are relics of the late Ming dynasty (1368–1644). The hall preserved the majestic and impressive architectural style of the Tang dynasty. The gilded copper statues of the Five Tathāgatas - Akshobhya, Amoghasiddhi, Vairocana, Amitābha and Ratnasambhava, which were made during the Five dynasties and Ten Kingdoms period (907–960), are enshrined in middle of the hall .

Zhenguo Pagoda
Zhenguo Pagoda is a five-storey wooden pagoda first built in 865 in the Tang dynasty (618–907). But it was destroyed and rebuilt into stone pagoda in 1238 in the Song dynasty (960–1276). The  pagoda was octagonal with five storeys. Every storey is carved with sixteen reliefs with a total of 80 vivid human figures.

Renshou Pagoda
The Renshou Pagoda was built in 917 in the Later Liang dynasty (907–923). In 1114 in the Song dynasty, it was renamed "Renshou Pagoda" by the Emperor Huizong.

Sweet Dew Altar of Precepts
The Sweet Dew Altar of Precepts is used for Buddhist believers to ordain the precepts. The caisson above the altar which applies the Ruyi brackets has complex and sophisticated structure. Among the brackets of the pillars around the altar, 24 statues of Flying Apsaras with five-color streamers are erected. They are holding musical instruments like pipa, two-stringed fiddle, castanet etc. and dancing elegantly and vividly. A wood carving sitting Ming dynasty statue of Rocana Buddha is placed on the altar. The lotus throne he sits has a thousand lotus petals, each of which is engraved with a  statue of Buddha.

Gallery

References

Bibliography
 
 

13th-century Buddhist temples
Buddhist temples in Quanzhou
Hindu temples in China
Tourist attractions in Quanzhou
680s establishments
7th-century establishments in China
Major National Historical and Cultural Sites in Fujian